Muhammad Fakhri son of Muhammad Nafi son of Muhammad Saeed al-Tabaqchali son of Muhammad Amin Effendi (born 1900 in Baghdad, died 1985), the teacher is an Iraqi judge and politician who held various administrative positions such as the position of administrator of Basra and others, and held the position of a member of the Iraqi Court of Cassation.

Education and career 
He studied at the Law School in Baghdad.

He held the position of the head of architecture for the period January 23, 1945 until he was succeeded by Musa Kazem Al Shaker on November 29, 1947. He then held the position of the governor of Basra, and also held the position of Mayor of Baghdad, succeeding Abdullah al-Qassab for the period from April 1, 1953 to 29. April 1954, Perhaps one of his most prominent works is laying the foundation stone for the city of Faisal in 1953 in the city of Al-Shammiyya. He was succeeded in the position by Fakhri Al Fakhri.
He then served as Minister of Justice in the second Ministry of Arshad al-Omari for the period from April 29, 1954 to June 17, 1954. He also served as Minister of the Interior for four days in 1954.

References 

1900 births
Iraqi politicians
1985 deaths
Justice ministers of Iraq